WAAJ is a radio station (89.7 FM) licensed to Benton, Kentucky, United States.

WAAJ may also refer to:

 WLOR, a radio station (1550 AM) licensed to Huntsville, Alabama, United States, which used the call sign WAAJ from April 1989 to April 1993
 Tampa Padang Airport, in Mamuju, West Sulawesi, Indonesia